Famen Temple is a Buddhist temple located in Famen town, Fufeng County, 120 kilometers west of Xi'an, Shaanxi, China. It was widely regarded as the "ancestor of pagoda temples in Guanzhong".

History

Han dynasty
One theory, supported by unearthed eaves-tiles and carved bricks of Han dynasty (206 BC–220 AD), is that the temple was built during the Northern Zhou dynasty, by Emperor Huan and also by Emperor Ling of the Eastern Han dynasty (25–220).

Northern dynasties
The literature record indicates that during Northern Wei dynasty (386–534), Famen Temple already existed on a quite large scale. However, Buddhism was greatly suppressed in Emperor Wu's years of Northern Zhou dynasty (557–581), and Famen Temple was almost completely destroyed.

Sui dynasty
After establishment of Sui dynasty (589–618), Buddhism was venerated, and Famen Temple was rebuilt, although it couldn't be recovered to its heyday in Northern Wei dynasty. Its name was changed to Cheng Shi Dao Chang, and soon it merged with nearby Baochang Temple, and became a temple-owned farm.

Tang dynasty
Famen Temple entered its halcyon days after formation of the Tang dynasty (618–907). During the first year of the reign of Wude of the Tang dynasty (618), it was named Famen Temple, and monks were recruited the following year. Later the temple took in homeless people fleeing chaos caused by war at the end of the Sui dynasty, and was unfortunately burnt. It was rebuilt later by monks. In Zhenguan 5th year (631), Zhang Liang was appointed to demolish Wangyun Palace to build the pagoda. It was rebuilt in Gaozong Xianqing 5th year (660), and was a four-storied pavilion-like pagoda. It was named later by Tang Zhongzong True Relic Pagoda. Tang Zhongzong actively advocated Buddhism, and along with Empress Wei buried their hair under the pagoda (unearthed in autumn 1978). Jinglong 4th year (710), the temple was renamed Grand Empire Carefree King Temple, and the pagoda Grand True Relic Pagoda. In Wenzong Kaicheng 3rd year (AD 838), it was renamed Fayun Temple, but soon reverted to the name Famen. When Buddhism was suppressed in Huichang in the year of Wuzong, Famen Temple was affected. During Yizong's reign, the last Buddha relic acquisition in Tang dynasty took place. At that time, Famen Temple was rebuilt, and its underground palace was not later altered. The emperors of Tang dynasty acquired Buddha relics 7 times here, and every time donated generously, which facilitated the expansion of the temple and pagoda. After being built and renovated multiple times, Famen Temple evolved into a scale of 24 courtyards.

Five Dynasties and Ten Kingdoms period
During the Five Dynasties and Ten Kingdoms period, the Prince of Qin Li Maozhen spent more than 30 years renovating Famen Temple. In Houzhou Zhizong's year, Buddhism was restricted, but Famen Temple was not abandoned.

Song and Jin dynasties
After establishment of North Song dynasty, Famen Temple was revived again. After being renovated many times, in Da'an 2nd year, Jin dynasty, it was claimed to be "Temple and Pagoda against Heaven".

Ming dynasty
During Longqing's years (1567–1572) of the Ming dynasty, Famen Temple was greatly destroyed in Guanzhong earthquake, and the wood pagoda built in Tang dynasty collapsed. In Wanli 7th year (1579), the "True Relic Pagoda" was rebuilt, and became 13-storied brick-mimic-timber structured pavilion-like pagoda.

Qing dynasty
During the Qing dynasty, Famen Temple was renovated in Shunzhi 12th year (1655), Qianlong 34th year (1769), and Guangxu 10th year (1884). In Tongzhi 1st year (1862), the temple was damaged in Huimin Uprising in Shaanxi province. It's rebuilt later, but scale shrank a lot.

Republic of China
After formation of the Republic of China, Famen Temple was used to station army continuously, and it was largely ruined. Because of natural and man-made calamities and the masses living in dire poverty, North China Philanthropy Association decided to rebuild the temple and pagoda, and use labor work as methods to relieve the distress. The reconstruction started in 1938, and concluded in July 1940. A month later, the Buddhist activities were restored.

People's Republic of China
After the establishment of the People's Republic of China, Famen Temple was among the first key protected historical relics of the province. However, the properties of the temple were still appropriated for public uses, such like schools in Famen town. During Cultural Revolution, the Red Guard damaged temple halls and Buddhist figures under the name of "breaking four old fashions". The abbot, Liangqing, incinerated himself in front of the True Relic Pagoda, in order to protect temple's underground palace. When the palace was unearthed later, the relic of self-immolation could still be seen. Other monks were either demobilized or killed. The temple became "the temporary headquarters of proletariat rebellion of Fufeng County". After 1979, Shaanxi province government once funded restoration of the Mahavira Hall and the Brass Buddha Pavilion. At 1:57am of 4 August 1981, half side wall of True Relic Pagoda collapsed in the heavy rain. This incident drew universal attention. In 1984, the government implemented religious policy and handed Famen Temple to Buddhist community. In 1985, Shaanxi province government decided to pull down the remaining half side wall and rebuild the True Relic Pagoda. On 3 April 1987, the underground palace of True Relic Pagoda in Famen Temple was opened, and a large quantities of precious historical relics were unearthed. This was quite a hit in news at that time. The expansion of the temple and the reconstruction of the pagoda were completed in October 1988. On 9 November of the same year, the Famen Temple Museum was opened.

On 16 Oct 2014, the World Fellowship of Buddhists held its 27th General Conference in the temple marking a milestone as it's the first time the conference is held in China.

New complex

In May 2009 the Shaanxi government finished constructing the first phase of a much larger complex in addition to the Famen Temple.  The new "Famen Temple Cultural Scenic Area" added  to the temple complex.  The most obvious feature of the new complex is the 148m Namaste Dagoba and vault (see below).

Architecture

Famen Temple currently maintains such a layout as Grand Hall following Pagoda. The True Relic Pagoda is regarded as the middle axle of the temple. Before it stand the Front Gate, the Front Hall, and behind it is the Grand Hall of Great Sage. This is the typical layout of the early Buddhist temples in China.

The True Relic Pagoda has been altered several times. It evolved from four-storied pavilion-like pagoda in Tang Dynasty to thirteen-storied brick pagoda in Ming Dynasty. The current version was rebuilt based on the surveyed drawing of the pagoda in Ming Dynasty before it collapsed. It is made of armored concrete as skeleton, and then covered by grey bricks. Inside the pagoda there are sightseeing platforms for tourists.

The underground palace was restored to the structure of Tang Dynasty. Only few severely damaged parts were replaced. The whole palace was built by white marbles and limestone tablets. Inner walls and stony gate are all engraved. During the renovation of the underground palace, a circular basement was built surrounding the Tang palace, and Buddhist shrines were included. The preserved Buddhist finger relic rests at the center of the underground palace.

The western division of the temple is Famen Temple Museum, including multi-functioning reception hall, treasure hall and other buildings.

Relics

Buddha's relics

From 5–12 May 1987, after the opening of an underground palace, four relics claimed to be directly related to Buddha were found. Two of these were made of white jade. The third relic was from a famous monk. These three are called "duplicate relics". They were placed together with a "true relic" in order to protect them. The true relic is yellow-colored, with bone-like secretory granules. It is believed to be a finger bone of the Gautama Buddha (Sakyamuni). Thereafter, Famen Temple became a Buddhist place of pilgrimage due to the discovery of what is claimed as a true relic of Buddha.

The finger bone was preserved in the last of eight boxes, each enclosing the others, each wrapped in thin silk. The outer box was in sandalwood and had rotted away, but the smaller boxes were in gold, some in silver, and one in jade, and were in a good state of preservation. Each box had a silver lock and was exquisitely carved.

The true relic is exactly the same as the description by Tang dynasty Buddhist DaoXuan and other Tang dynasty records.

The relics have been abroad four times, 1994/11/29 - 1995/02/29 in Thailand, 2002/02/23 - 2002/03/30 in Taiwan, 2004/05/26 - 2004/06/05 in Hong Kong, 2005/11/11 - 2005/12/21 in South Korea.

Gold & silver relics

The underground "Palace" is now a museum, and contains some other relics. One of the best preserved is a gilt silver tea set, said to be one of the earliest royal tea sets ever discovered.  It includes a tea caddy woven out of metallic yarn, a gilt silver tortoise-shaped tea box, a tea roller-grinder, and a silver stove for brewing the tea. As a part of the set, a kind of container for mixing tea, called a Tiao Da Zi, was used for tea mixing and drinking, since in ancient China the tea drinking ceremony was treated to some extent just like a meal. First, tea was put into the container and spices added. Some boiled water was used to mix the tea into paste, and them more hot water was added to make it into drinkable tea.

In addition, there is a magnificent silver-gilded incense burner on display, as well as a silver-gold decorated sandalwood burner. This consists of a burner cover, stack, feet and other parts. The bottom rim of the cover is decorated with a circle of lotus petals patterns, and the upper part is carved with five lotuses and enlaced tendrils. On each lotus lies a tortoise with its head turned back, holding flowers in its mouth. The burner has five feet in the shape of beasts, the front parts of which are in the shape of unicorns. The inscription on the burner indicates that it was made in 869 AD by an imperial workshop specialized in fabricating gold and silver ware for the imperial family.

A tortoise-shaped gold-plated container with silver inlays is on display in the museum, the cover of which carved with turtle-shell and brocade patterns. The container is 13 cm high, 28.3 cm long, 15 cm wide.  In addition, there is a set of five gilded-silver plates of exquisite workmanship believed to date from the Tang dynasty.

A magnificent set of mini-sized costumes specially fabricated for the Bodhisattva can be seen, the most typical being a half-sleeved blouse 6.5 cm in length, with 4.1 cm-long sleeves.  This modelled on a typical short sleeved blouse worn by ladies in the Tang Dynasty, and is made in the style of what the Chinese call "Gold Couching Embroidery," and is top-grade crinkled embroidery made by embroidering with gold threads. The blouse was worn drooped to the chest and has buttons down the front, with the collar and sleeve rims decorated with patterns embroidered with twisted gold threads. The average diameter of the gold threads is 0.1mm, with the thinnest segment as thin as 0.06mm, which is thinner than a hair. Moreover, one meter of gold thread is developed from 3,000 circles of gold foil, which is hard to achieve even in modern times characterized by high technology. In particular, loop edges of the gold threads make the fabric seem like a painting, and are arranged to display gradually changing colours. The garment is obviously made by a master-hand and can be rated as an unsurpassed piece of embroidery.

Also on display are 121 gold and silver articles, 17 glass articles, 16 pieces of olive green porcelain, more than 700 pieces of silk fabrics, 104 Buddhist figurines, hundreds of volumes of Buddhist scripture.

Colored glaze
Colored Glaze is just today's glass. Chinese glass manufacturing technology was long influenced by western Asia, and most common style was Islamic. Because of it rarity, glass apparatus was as valuable as gold and jade. The unearthed glass apparatuses are mostly hollowware such as disks, plates and bowls, totally over 20 pieces.

Ceramics

Chinese celadon were highly regarded by connoisseurs, and sometimes made more or less exclusively for the court. Of particular note was an earlier type such as the mi se (秘色瓷 "secret colour" or "mystic colour") wares,. Speculation arose concerning whether mi se referred to the secret craft of the glazing colour or if it referred to a specific colour.  The ceramic type was finally identified when the underground crypt at the Famen Temple was opened, revealing a description on the accounting tablet in the underground palace, and by the unearthing of thirteen precious pieces of mi se ceramics.

Silk
China's silk industry reached its prime time in Tang Dynasty, and the silk fabrics discovered in underground palace provided a convincing evidence. Most of those fabrics were contributed by former Empresses. Among them there is an "Empress Wu's Embroidered Skirt" belonging to Wu Zetian.

Figure of Buddha
There were 88 niches of Buddha in the 13-storied pagoda in Ming Dynasty, each containing a figure. By 1939, there were only 68 left. Later after clear-up, 98 figures of Buddha had been found in total, many containing scriptures, sealed at the times of Ming Dynasty and the Republic of China.

Namaste Dagoba
The Dagoba is designed by Taipei 101 architect C. Y. Lee. With the height of a 35-story building (148m), the Namaste Dagoba is likely (yet unverified) the tallest Buddhist stupa in the world.  The Dagoba was designed to not only be a place of worship but to house the relics unearthed from the Famen pagoda.

See also
List of Chinese cultural relics forbidden to be exhibited abroad

References

Bibliography

External links
Famen Temple Official Site  
法门寺简介 
 The Famensi Pagoda

Buddhist temples in Baoji
Baoji
Major National Historical and Cultural Sites in Shaanxi
Buddhist relics